Hikayat Awang Sulong Merah Muda (Jawi: حكاية اوڠ سولوڠ ميره مودا) is a literary work that was published in 1907. It came from an oral tale narrated by Pawang Ana and was written by Raja Haji Yahya. The hikayat was published by Sir R. Winstedt dan A. J. Sturrock.Kotekkun Meng Huat Eric Lee

References
 Hikayat Awang Sulong Merah Muda [Microfilm: NL 5878]. (1907). Singapore: Methodist Publishing House. (RRARE 899.2302 HIK)

External links
 PDF - Aksara: The Passage of Malay Scripts.
 Hikayat Awang Sulong Merah Muda by Pawang Ana.

History of Malaysia
Malay-language literature
Jawi manuscripts